André de Brienne ( 1135 – 4 October 1189), lord of Ramerupt, was a French nobleman who participated in the Third Crusade.

Life
André was the fourth son of Walter II, count of Brienne and Adelaide of Baudement. He married Alix of Venizy in 1167, was knighted in 1168, and inherited his father's half of Ramerupt in 1176.

André arrived in the Holy Land on 28 August 1189 to participate in the Siege of Acre with the first French troops, which he led alongside James of Avesnes, Henry I of Barres and Philip of Dreux. On 4 October that year, Saladin launched a new attack against the crusader army besieging the town. The battle was quickly won by the crusaders, but when they had victory within their grasp the crusaders' camp descended into anarchy and began to flee. André of Brienne, in command of the rearguard, tried to stop the fleeing crusaders and send them back into battle, but he was thrown from his horse. Covered in injuries, his screams of despair did not move his companions, not even his brother Erard, as they fled, leaving him to die there. Seven thousand other crusaders were also killed in this battle, including Gerard of Ridefort, grandmaster of the Templars.

Family, marriage and issue
Around 1167 he married Alix of Venizy. They had the following children:
 Gautier of Brienne
 Erard of Brienne (c. 1170–1245), lord of Ramerupt and of Vénisy.
 Elisabeth of Brienne who married Milon lord of Pougy.
 Agnès of Brienne, who around 1211 married Miles IV lord of Noyers.
 Ada of Brienne

Ancestry

Notes

References

Sources

1130s births
1189 deaths
Christians of the Third Crusade
House of Brienne